Zhelanne is an urban-type settlement in Pokrovsk Raion of Donetsk Oblast, Ukraine. Population:

References

Urban-type settlements in Pokrovsk Raion